Francesco Villamena (1564–1624) was an Italian engraver, drawing teacher and art collector.

Villamena was born in Assisi. He studied under Cornelis Cort. Others state he was a follower of Agostino Carracci. Villamena produced primarily works of religious and historical subjects. He died in Rome in 1624.

References

Further reading

1564 births
1624 deaths
Italian engravers
People from Assisi
16th-century Italian artists
Italian male artists
17th-century Italian artists